Troyes AC Féminine is a French football representing ES Troyes AC. It currently competes in the Féminines Régional 1 Grand Est.

History
Having competed in the third tier of French women's football for ten seasons, Troyes were denied promotion to Division 2 by the early cancellation of the 2019–20 season, during which they had built up a four point lead after eleven unbeaten games.

Later the following year, Troyes became part of the City Football Group when the organisation purchased a majority shareholding in Troyes AC, becoming the fourth senior women side run by the group.

National competition record

References

 
Women's football clubs in France
Football clubs in Grand Est
Troyes